is a fishing video game for the Nintendo's Wii console that was released on September 18, 2007{In this game the player uses the Wii Remote to fish. Most of the fish players can catch are real, but there are some fictional fish can be caught as the game progresses. Players can also buy upgrades of their pole and new kinds of bait. Its sequel Fishing Master World Tour was released on January 6, 2009, in North America. The game was ported to mobile phones in 2010, but it has since been taken down after Hudson Soft became fully bankrupt and was absorbed into Konami.

Story 
An old man, assumed to be the grandfather of the family, tells you that you have the potential to be a "Fishing Master". He has you catch fish in different regions in Japan until you are ready for a tournament, in the tournament you have to catch several of a specific fish and it needs to be bigger, longer, or heavier than the three other named computer characters. You will never see these characters though. After winning the tournament in every region, you'll be crowned the "Fishing Master" by the old man. After you win the tournament, you unlock a secret island where there are more fishing spots and gain access to another tournament. You also have the option to catch every fish and fill out the fish charts which give you little bites of information about the fish.

References

2007 video games
Fishing video games
Hudson Soft games
Video games developed in Japan
Wii games